Hardman Farm State Historic Site is a Georgia state historic site near Helen, Georgia. The historic site includes an 1870 Italianate mansion and a gazebo-topped Native American burial mound. Other structures include a kitchen, horse barn, dairy barn, and spring house.

Capt. James Nichols built the main house in 1870 and the gazebo atop Nacoochee Mound in 1890. His daughter Anna Ruby Nichols is the namesake of Anna Ruby Falls.

In 1893 the home was purchased by Calvin Hunnicutt, a businessman from Atlanta.

Lamartine Griffin Hardman purchased the property in 1903. The property remained in the Hardman family, and was donated to the state of Georgia in 1999.

Facilities
Sautee Nacoochee Indian Mound
1-mile Nature Trail from Hardman Farm to Helen.
Visitor Center
Guided mansion tour

References

External links
 Hardman Farm State Historic Site - official site

Historic sites in Georgia (U.S. state)